Pengiran Muda Mahkota Pengiran Muda Haji Al-Muhtadee Billah Hospital, abbreviated as PMMPMHAMB Hospital, is the district hospital of Tutong District, Brunei. It is situated in Bukit Bendera, an area near the district town Pekan Tutong. The hospital was opened in 1997 and can accommodate 138 beds. It was named after Al-Muhtadee Billah, the Crown Prince of Brunei. It is the only hospital in the district, as well as one of the few government hospitals in the country.

Healthcare services which are provided in the hospital include outpatient, accident and emergency; paediatrics, obstetrics and gynaecology; physiotherapy, psychiatry, general surgery, dental clinic, ear, nose and throat clinic, eye clinic, physiotherapy, occupational therapy and inpatient wards.

The hospital has been accredited as a teaching hospital by Pengiran Anak Puteri Rashidah Sa'adatul Bolkiah Institute of Health Sciences, the country's medical school which is under Universiti Brunei Darussalam.

Background 
The hospital was built to replace the former Tutong District Hospital. It was one of the projects under the sixth National Development Plan, the national public works scheme, with a budget of B$32 million at that time. The construction began in 1994 and completed by 1996; it was opened on 24 July 1997 and inaugurated by the Crown Prince Al-Muhtadee Billah on 11 August 1998.

References 

Hospitals in Brunei
Tutong District

External links 
 Pengiran Muda Mahkota Pengiran Muda Haji Al-Muhtadee Billah Hospital on Ministry of Health website